Patrick Malone (30 May 1916 – 3 December 1993) was an Irish Fine Gael politician.

Malone was elected to Dáil Éireann as a Fine Gael Teachta Dála (TD) for the Kildare from 1970, when he won a by election caused by the death of Gerard Sweetman. He was re-elected at the subsequent 1973 general election but was defeated at the 1977 general election. He previously served as a member of the Seanad from 1965, and was elected for the Agricultural Panel in 1965 and the Administrative Panel in 1969

References

1916 births
1993 deaths
Fine Gael TDs
Members of the 19th Dáil
Members of the 20th Dáil
Members of the 11th Seanad
Members of the 12th Seanad
Politicians from County Kildare
Fine Gael senators